Boris Abramovich Kushner (December 10, 1941May 7, 2019) was a mathematician, poet and essayist.  His primary contribution in mathematics was in the field of Constructive Mathematical Analysis and the Theory of Constructive Numbers and Functions.  He has published several books of poetry (in Russian) and a number of music, literary, and  political essays (Russian and English). Dr. Kushner taught at the University of Pittsburgh at Johnstown, Pennsylvania.

References

 B.A. Kushner, E. Mendelson (Translator). "Lectures on constructive mathematical analysis". American Mathematical Society, 1984.
 Boris Kushner, Yulia Kushner (Illustrator). "Prichina Pechali - the Reason of Sadness: Selected Poems 1993-1996". VIA Press, Baltimore, 1999.

External links 

Russian mathematicians
Russian male poets
1941 births
2019 deaths